Songdo LNG Baseball Stadium is a baseball stadium in Incheon, South Korea. SK Wyverns of the KBO Futures League used the stadium between 2007 and 2014.

Baseball venues in South Korea
Sports venues in Incheon
SSG Landers
Venues of the 2014 Asian Games